The Trip is the fourteenth studio album by the rock band Djam Karet. It was released in 2013 on HC Productions.

Track listing

Personnel 
Adapted from The Trip liner notes.
Djam Karet
 Gayle Ellett – Greek bouzouki, Moog synthesizer, organ, mellotron, tape, electronics, flute, mixing, mastering
 Mike Henderson – electric guitar, electronics
 Aaron Kenyon – electric 5-string bass, electronics
 Mike Murray – electric guitar, acoustic guitar, electronics
 Chuck Oken, Jr. – drums, percussion, synthesizer, electronics, recording

Release history

References

External links 
 The Trip at Discogs (list of releases)
 The Trip at Bandcamp

2013 albums
Djam Karet albums